Juan de Santa Cruz Pachacuti Yamqui Salcamayhua (Viceroyalty of Perú, end of the 16th century – 17th century) was an indigenous Peruvian chronicler, author of the work , of brief length but great worth for the ethnohistorical studies.

Peruvian people of Aymara descent